Yeniçağ or Yeni Çağ ("New Era" in Turkish) is a nationalist newspaper in Turkey. It was established in 2002.

In 2008 Yeniçağ criticized the Turkish Journalists' Association for giving an award to Doğan Özgüden (co-founder of Info-Türk) and Özgüden for accepting it, describing him as "An Armenian defender" who had more than 50 lawsuits against him. On the evening of 8 December 2016, the paper's Istanbul headquarters were trashed by a mob of masked assailants carrying batons and other improvised weapons after pro-government figures criticised the paper's editorial line.

References

External links 
yenicaggazetesi.com.tr. Website of Yeniçağ (in Turkish).

Newspapers published in Istanbul
Turkish-language newspapers
Far-right politics in Turkey
Newspapers established in 2002
2002 establishments in Turkey
Nationalist newspapers
Daily newspapers published in Turkey